Salvatore Pinna (born 23 August 1975) is an Italian goalkeeper.

External links
 
 

1975 births
Living people
Italian footballers
Delfino Pescara 1936 players
People from Sorso
Footballers from Sardinia
Association football goalkeepers
S.E.F. Torres 1903 players